Itoya (Japanese: 伊東屋; stylized as ITO-YA) is a Japanese stationery brand founded in 1904 (Meiji 37) in Ginza, Tokyo.

Its original location was destroyed in the 1923 Great Kantō earthquake.

Its American subsidiary, ITOYA of America, Ltd., was established in 1976. The Itoya subsidiary brand topdrawer has retail stores in Japan and the US.

References

External links

 

1904 establishments
Ginza
Japanese stationery